Postoperative nausea and vomiting (PONV) is the phenomenon of nausea, vomiting, or retching experienced by a patient in the postanesthesia care unit (PACU) or within 24 hours following a surgical procedure. PONV affects about 10% of the population undergoing general anaesthesia each year. PONV can be unpleasant and lead to a delay in mobilization and food, fluid, and medication intake following surgery.

Cause

Emetogenic drugs commonly used in anaesthesia include nitrous oxide, physostigmine, and opioids. The intravenous anaesthetic propofol is currently the least emetogenic general anaesthetic. These medications are thought to stimulate the chemoreceptor trigger zone. This area is on the floor of the fourth ventricle and is effectively outside of the blood-brain barrier, which makes it incredibly sensitive to toxin and pharmacological stimulation. Several neurotransmitters are known, such as histamine, dopamine, serotonin, acetylcholine, and the more recently discovered neurokinin-1 (substance P).

Risk factors
A 2008 study compared 121 Japanese patients who experienced PONV after being given the general anesthetic propofol to 790 people who were free of postoperative nausea after receiving it. Those with a G at both copies of rs1800497 were 1.6 times more likely to experience PONV within six hours of surgery compared to those with the AG or AA genotypes, but they were not significantly more likely to experience PONV more than six hours after surgery.

PONV results from patient, surgical, and anesthetic factors.

Surgical factors that confer increased risk for PONV include procedures of increased length and gynecological, abdominal, laparoscopic  and ENT procedures, and strabismus procedures in children.

Anesthetic risk factors include the use of volatile anesthetics, nitrous oxide (N2O), opioids, and longer duration of anesthesia.

Patient factors that confer increased risk for PONV include female gender, obesity, age less than 16 years, past history of motion sickness or chemotherapy-induced nausea, high levels of preoperative anxiety, and patients with history of PONV.

Smokers and the elderly often have a decreased risk for PONV.

A risk-stratification method created by Apfel et al has been developed to determine a patient's risk for PONV. The presence of 0, 1, 2, 3, or 4 of any of the following risk factors corresponds to a PONV respective risk of 10, 20, 40, 60, and 80%.

- Female gender

- Non-smoking

- History of PONV or motion sickness

- Expectant use of postoperative opioid medications

Prevention 
Treatment options to prevent PONV include medications such as antiemetics (for example, ondansetron or dexamethasone) or other drugs including tropisetron, dolasetron, cyclizine, and granisetron. Droperidol may cause QT prolongation and is not frequently used. Other approaches to reduce PONV include decision on the types of anaesthetic used during surgery and intravenous (IV) dextrose solutions. Increasing the IV fluids during surgery by giving additional fluid while the person is under general anaesthesia may reduce the risk of nausea/vomiting after surgery. For minor surgical procedures, more research is needed to determine the risks and benefits of this approach.

Management
Because  currently no single antiemetic available is especially effective on its own, experts recommend a multimodal approach. Anesthetic strategies to prevent vomiting include using regional anesthesia whenever possible and avoiding medications that cause vomiting. Medications to treat and prevent PONV are limited by both cost and the adverse effects. People with risk factors likely warrant preventive medication, whereas a "wait and see" strategy is appropriate for those without risk factors.

Preoperative fasting
Fasting guidelines often restrict the intake of any oral fluid 2-6 hours preoperatively, but in a large retrospective analysis in Torbay Hospital, unrestricted clear oral fluids until transfer to theatre could significantly reduce the incidence of postoperative nausea and vomiting without an increased risk in the adverse outcomes for which such conservative guidance exists.

Medications
A multimodal approach to treating a patient with PONV can be efficacious. Numerous patient factors and medication adverse effects must be taken into consideration when selecting a treatment regimen.
 Serotonin (5-HT3) receptor antagonists can be administered as a single dose at the end of surgery. Adverse effects include prolongation of the QT interval on electrocardiogram (EKG). Medications include ondansetron, granisetron, and dolasetron.
 Anticholinergics can be used as a long-acting patch placed behind the patient's ear. Adverse effects include dry mouth and blurry vision. Care must be taken when handling the patch, as transfer of medication to the eye can induce pupillary dilation. Avoid use in elderly patients. Medications include scopolamine.
 Glucocorticoids have direct antiemetic effects and can reduce need for postoperative opioids. Adverse effects include a transient increase in serum glucose level, and poor wound healing (controversial).  Medications include dexamethasone.
 Butyrophenones are typically administered as a single injection at the end of surgery. Adverse effects include prolongation of the QT interval on EKG.  Medications include droperidol and haloperidol.
 Phenothiazines are particularly effective in treating opioid-induced PONV. Adverse effects are dose-dependent and include sedation and extrapyramidal symptoms.  Medications include promethazine and prochlorperazine.
 Neurokinin 1 (NK1) receptor antagonists prevent an emetic signal from being transmitted.  Medications include aprepitant and rolapitant.
 Histamine receptor antagonists can be administered by multiple routes, including orally, intramuscularly, or rectally. Adverse effects include dry mouth, sedation, and urinary retention.  Medications include dimenhydrinate and diphenhydramine.
 Propofol, an anesthetic medication, confers its own antiemetic properties.

The 2020 Cochrane Anaesthesia Review Group review of Drugs for preventing postoperative nausea and vomiting in adults
after general anaesthesia: a network meta-analysis (Review)  demonstrated that combination therapy is more effective than single anti-emetic, and that dexamethasone and ondansetron (a commonly used combination) are two of the most effective anti-emetics for PONV. The review adds robust evidence of efficacy for drugs in newer classes, such as aprepitant or fosapreitant, or newer agents in familiar classes, such as ramosetron. The review does not cover the cost effectiveness of the agents included and, despite increased efficacy for newer novel agents, this may preclude their immediate utilisation in anaesthetic practice.

Alternative medicine
In conjunction with antiemetic medications, at least one study has found that application to the pericardium meridian 6 acupressure point produced a positive effect in relieving PONV. Another study found no statistically significant difference. The two general types of alternative pressure therapy are sham acupressure and the use of the P6 point. A 2015 study found  no significant difference between the use of either therapy in the treatment or prevention of PONV. In a review of 59 studies, both therapies significantly affected the nausea aspect, but had no significant effect on vomiting.

Cannabinoids have also been used for treatment of PONV, but its safety and efficacy are controversial.

Epidemiology
Typically, the incidence of nausea or vomiting after general anesthesia ranges between 25 and 30%. Nausea and vomiting can be extremely distressing for patients, and so is one of their major concerns. Vomiting has been associated with major complications, such as pulmonary aspiration of gastric content, and might endanger surgical outcomes after certain procedures, for example after maxillofacial surgery with wired jaws. Nausea and vomiting can delay discharge, and about 1% of patients scheduled for day surgery require unanticipated overnight admission because of uncontrolled PONV.

References

Further reading
 Blackburn, J., Spencer, R. (2015). Postoperative nausea and vomiting.
 Pleuvry, B. (2015). Physiology and pharmacology of nausea and vomiting.

External links 

Anesthesia
Vomiting